Herkimer County Community College is a public community college in Herkimer, New York. It is part of the State University of New York system.

History 
The college was approved by the State University of New York in 1965, and the County Board of Supervisors authorized the college in 1966. The first class, numbering 221 freshmen, entered in the Fall of 1967 at a temporary campus in the Village of Ilion.  The temporary campus was the upper floors of the Remington Arms Company. The current, permanent campus came into use in 1971.

Herkimer College offers programs leading to associate degrees or certificates in several dozen program areas. The college has partnered with Cazenovia College to offer a bachelor's degrees in "Criminal Justice and Homeland Security" and Inclusive Early Childhood on the Herkimer campus. The College's Internet Academy offers 20 degrees, three certificates and more than 150 courses, as well as support services, completely online.

On-campus housing 

Campus Meadows
Campus Meadows is the largest residential quad and offers several different styles of apartments including townhouses (two double bedrooms), one-bedroom flats (one double bedroom), two-bedroom flats (two double bedrooms) and dorm-style flats (one bedroom w/ four students). Each apartment includes a full kitchen, living room and bathroom.
Furnished four-person apartments, double occupancy bedrooms

College Hill Apartments
College Hill offers several styles of apartments including two single bedrooms, two bedrooms shared (one single bedroom and one double bedroom) and one double bedroom. Each apartment includes a full kitchen, living room and bathroom.

Reservoir Run
The newest of the on-campus housing quads is Reservoir Run, featuring four–person suite style apartments. Each apartment includes a living room, full kitchen with microwave, laundry room, four single bedrooms and two bathrooms. This residential community is primarily reserved for second-year students.
Furnished four-person apartments, single occupancy bedrooms

Athletics 
Herkimer's athletic program began with five sports in 1970, under the direction of Tom LaPuma, and has grown to include 19 varsity offerings. With its growth has come great success with 60 NJCAA National Championships, 128 Region III Championships, 169 Mountain Valley Collegiate Conference championships, and 31 NJCAA Academic Team of the Year awards as of Spring 2020.

The Herkimer Generals athletics program has won the National Alliance of Two-Year College Athletic Administrators (NATYCAA) Cup four times, in 2014, 2015, 2017, and 2020. The award recognizes Herkimer as first in the nation among two-year non-scholarship athletic programs.

Herkimer College announces a new A.A.S degree program, Esports Management, to begin in the fall 2023 semester.
The program seems to be well-rounded, not only teaching students about esports management but also providing them with a critical business foundation. This should give graduates an edge in the job market and open up a variety of career paths, such as events management, broadcasting, public relations, marketing, and sales.

Herkimer College already has a successful esports team competing nationally. And with the establishment of an esports arena on campus, the college is committed to supporting both the esports team and the Esports Management degree program.

Notable people
Leigh and Leslie Keno, antiquarians
Shane Hurlbut, cinematographer
Regy Thorpe, professional lacrosse player

References

External links
 Official website

Two-year colleges in the United States
SUNY community colleges
Educational institutions established in 1966
Education in Herkimer County, New York
Buildings and structures in Herkimer County, New York
1966 establishments in New York (state)